Deerfield Township is a civil township of Mecosta County in the U.S. state of Michigan. The population was 1,630 at the 2000 census.

Geography

History
Deerfield Township was established in 1861.

Communities
Borland was a hamlet in Deerfield Township. It was founded in 1869 by John A. Bell and named Bell Crossing. When the Grand Rapids and Indiana Railroad came through the place was renamed Bell Siding. The name was changed to Borland when the post office was established in the general store operated by Daniel Borland.

Demographics
As of the census of 2000, there were 1,630 people, 531 households, and 420 families residing in the township. The racial makeup of the township was 95.95% White, 1.04% African American, 1.29% Native American, 0.43% Asian, 0.31% from other races, and 0.98% from two or more races. Hispanic or Latino of any race were 1.53% of the population.

There were 531 households, out of which 43.1% had children under the age of 18 living with them, 65.0% were married couples living together, 8.5% had a female householder with no husband present, and 20.9% were non-families. 16.4% of all households were made up of individuals, and 6.6% had someone living alone who was 65 years of age or older. The average household size was 3.07 and the average family size was 3.40.

In the township the population was spread out, with 33.6% under the age of 18, 9.2% from 18 to 24, 28.1% from 25 to 44, 19.0% from 45 to 64, and 10.1% who were 65 years of age or older. The median age was 30 years. For every 100 females, there were 100.5 males. For every 100 females age 18 and over, there were 98.2 males.

The median income for a household in the township was $36,293, and the median income for a family was $38,750. Males had a median income of $30,900 versus $24,886 for females. The per capita income for the township was $13,693. About 9.4% of families and 13.4% of the population were below the poverty line, including 17.8% of those under age 18 and 6.0% of those age 65 or over.

References

Townships in Mecosta County, Michigan
1861 establishments in Michigan
Townships in Michigan